SW, sw or s/w may stand for:

Companies 
 Air Namibia, IATA airline code
 Sierra Wireless, Inc., TSX
 Silk Way Airlines, an Azerbaijani private cargo airline
 Slimming World, a weight loss company
 Smith & Wesson, S&W, a firearms manufacturer
 Southern Winds Airlines, a defunct Argentine airline
 Southwestern Company, a publishing company designed for college students

Geography 
 Southwest, one of the four ordinal directions
 Sweden (FIPS country code SW)
 SW postcode area, southwest London, England
 Schweinfurt, Bavaria, Germany, vehicle registration code
 Swietochlowice, Silesian Voivodeship, Poland, vehicle registration code

Occupations 
 Steelworker (US Navy), an occupational rating
 Enlisted Surface Warfare Specialist, a US Navy occupational rating
 Sex Worker

Science and technology

Computing and telecommunications
 Shortwave radio band, 1.6–30 MHz
 Shortwave radiation, in visible and near visible bands
 Smith–Waterman algorithm, algorithm for performing local sequence alignment

Other uses in science and technology
 Sport wagon or crossover, an automobile configuration 
 Station wagon, a designation of some manufacturers
 Olof Swartz, botanist, abbreviated Sw. in botanical citations
 Band 3, a protein
 Unified Soil Classification System symbol for well graded sand

Other uses 
 Swahili language (ISO 639 alpha-2 code "sw")
 Star Wars, a science fiction media franchise
 Suicide watch
"S.W", a song by Blonde Redhead from their 2007 album 23
 Shadow Warrior, a series of computer games